The 25th International 500-Mile Sweepstakes was held at the Indianapolis Motor Speedway on Monday, May 31, 1937.

Time trials
Ten-lap (25 mile) qualifying runs were utilized. During the time trials held on May 28, the car of Overton Phillips burst into flames when his crankshaft broke and punctured the gas tank. He then crashed into the pit area, killing spectator George Warford of Indianapolis. Injured were Phillips and his riding mechanic, Walter King, Anthony Caccia, the brother of Joe Caccia, who died in practice for the 1931 race, and Otto Rohde of Toledo, Ohio, a crew member for Champion Spark Plug. Rohde succumbed to his injuries on June 1, 1937.

On the same day, having completed four of ten scheduled qualifying laps, Frank McGurk's car plunged through an inner rail, overturned and ejected both McGurk, who was hospitalized in serious condition but survived, and his riding mechanic, Albert Opalko, who was killed. The crash was caused by a broken connecting rod.

* Bill Cummings' tenth lap of 125.139 mph was a one-lap Speedway track record at the time.

Race details
For 1937, riding mechanics were required. Jigger Johnson served as Wilbur Shaw's riding mechanic. Johnson, who also rode with 1931 winner Louis Schneider, became the second two-time Indianapolis 500 winning riding mechanic. Johnson would be the final winning riding mechanic in Indy history. Starting in the 1938 Indianapolis 500, riding mechanics were made optional, and would no longer be utilized in the race by any entrants.

After being banned for several years, superchargers were once again permitted.

Jimmy Snyder
One of the more notable performances of the 1937 race belonged to Jimmy Snyder. During time trials on May 22, Snyder took to the track for his 10-lap attempt late in the day, nearing sundown. He ran his first lap at a track record of 130.492 mph. His second lap (129.422 mph) and third lap (127.334 mph) dropped off, and then officials waved off the run due to darkness. Snyder's run was officially incomplete, but the single-lap track record stood.

The following day, Snyder returned to the track, and while he did not match his speed from the day before, he finished his run at 125.287 mph, the fastest qualifier in the field. He would line up 19th on race day.

At the start, Snyder blew by most of the field, and was running as high as 6th at the conclusion of the first lap. By the fourth lap he was in the lead, and proceeded to lead 24 laps. On lap 27, however, he dropped out with mechanical trouble.

Late Race Summary
Late in the race, Wilbur Shaw held a comfortable lead, and had lapped second place Ralph Hepburn. With about 20 laps to go, however, Shaw's car had been leaking oil, and had nearly lost nearly all of the oil out of the crankcase. In addition, the right rear tire was heavily worn. Shaw slowed down considerably in an effort to nurse his car to the finish line. Shaw and his riding mechanic John "Jigger" Johnson were both suffering from burns due to the leaking oil. Second place Hepburn realized Shaw's problems, and began a charge to catch him. He unlapped himself, and went on a tear in hopes of victory.

As the laps dwindled down, Ralph Hepburn was closing dramatically. Shaw was largely defenseless, as he was carefully nursing the car around. As the car went in and out of the turns, the oil pressure was rising and dropping, and Shaw was calculating how much time he could give up per lap and still maintain the lead. Hepburn closed to a straightaway deficit, then was nearly in reach. On the final lap Hepburn pulled to within a few seconds, and by the last turn he was directly behind Shaw and looking to pass him for the win.

With nothing to lose, Shaw floored the accelerator and pulled away down the final straight. He held off Hepburn for the win by 2.16 seconds, the closest finish in Indy 500 history to that point.  The margin would stand as the closest finish ever at Indy until 1982.

Results

Alternates
First alternate: Emil Andres (withdrew)
Second alternate: Joel Thorne  — Thorne purchased the entry of the first alternate, and planned to buy the qualified car of Cliff Bergere. He then planned to withdraw both of those cars in order to elevate his own car (the second alternate) into the starting field. After the officials heard word of the solicitations, they forced him to stop the effort of effectively "buying his way in" to the field, and threatened suspension.

Failed to Qualify

Henry Banks  (#49)
Tom Cosman  (#63)
Dave Evans (#21)
Ira Hall (#37, #56)
Luther Johnson (#66)
Milt Marion  (#65)
Frank McGurk (#39)
Zeke Meyer (#52)
Duke Nalon  (#21)
Lee Oldfield  (#72)
Vern Ornduff  (#67)
Overton Phillips  (#66)
Al Putnam  (#46)
Johnny Seymour (#51)
Lou Webb  (#58)
Doc Williams (#57)
Woody Woodford  (#61)
Ray Yeagar  (#61)

Notes

Works cited
Floyd Clymer's 1909–1941 Indianapolis 500 Race History
Indianapolis 500 Chronicle

References

Indianapolis 500 races
Indianapolis 500
Indianapolis 500
1937 in American motorsport